Adity Mohsin is a Bangladeshi Rabindra Sangeet singer.

Early life
Mohsin joined Bulbul Academy of Fine Arts (BAFA). She met music composers Abdul Ahad and Fazle Nizami and completed her diploma in Rabindra Sangeet in 1988. She completed her IA from Holy Cross College, Dhaka. In 1992, with a scholarship from the Indian government, she went to Sangit Bhavana, Visva-Bharati University, Santiniketan to study music. She stood first class first in both her bachelors and masters.

Career 
Mohsin is the secretary of the Dhaka City Committee of the Jatio Rabindra Sangeet Sammilon Parishad. She is a member of the Bangladesh Rabindra Sangeet Shilpi Sangstha. Since 2000, she has worked as a senior teacher at Chhayanaut.

Works 
In 2003, Mohsin's first album was Amar Mon Cheye Roy. Her second album titled was Sharado Prate (2004). In 2013, she released Barshamukhor Raate Phagun Sameerane. She performs on Bangladesh Television, Bangladesh Betar, NTV, Maasranga Television, SA TV, and Tara Muzik. As a play-back singer, she has sung Rabindra Sangeet for different dramas and serials on various television channels in Bangladesh. She sang in Rabindranath Tagore's Chhinnapatra, a documentary film based on the still photographs of Nawajesh Ahmed.

In 2009, Mohsin performed in Kolkata with Asha Bhosle as one of the Panchakannya, along with Lopamudra Mitra, Subhamita Banerjee and Srabani Sen. In 2016, she performed in the Royal Albert Hall in London.

Albums

Solo albums

Mixed albums 
 Jagatey Andayagyae Aamar Nimantrano (2008)
 Moner Majhe Je Gaan Baje (2010)

Awards and honors 
 Debabrata Smriti Purashkar
 Anannya Top Ten Awards (2003)
 Citycell-Channel-i Music Awards for best Rabindra Sangeet singer (2016)

References 

Living people
21st-century Bangladeshi women singers
21st-century Bangladeshi singers
Rabindra Sangeet exponents
Visva-Bharati University alumni
Year of birth missing (living people)
Place of birth missing (living people)
20th-century women composers